The 2017 West Lothian Council election took place on 4 May 2017 to elect members of West Lothian Council. The election used the 9 wards created as a result of the Local Governance (Scotland) Act 2004, with each ward electing three or four Councillors using the single transferable vote system form of proportional representation, with 33 Councillors being elected. The election resulted in no overall party majority, leading to the Labour Party and the Conservative Party forming a coalition administration.

Election result summary

Ward results

Linlithgow
2012: 1 x Conservative, 1 x SNP, 1 x Labour
2017: 1 x Conservative, 1 x SNP, 1 x Labour
2012-2017 Change: No Change

Broxburn, Uphall and Winchburgh 
2012: 2 x Labour, 2 x SNP
2017: 2 x SNP, 1 x Labour, 1 x Conservative
2012-2017 Change: 1 x Conservative gain from Labour

Livingston North
2012: 2 x SNP, 2 x Labour
2017: 2 x SNP, 1 x Labour, 1 x Conservative
2012-2017 Change: 1 x Conservative gain from Labour

Livingston South
2012: 2 x Labour, 2 x SNP
2017: 2 x SNP, 1 x Labour, 1 x Conservative
2012-2017 Change: 1 x Conservative gain from Labour

East Livingston and East Calder
2012: 2 x Labour, 2 x SNP
2017: 2 x SNP, 1 x Labour, 1 x Conservative 
2012-2017 Change: 1 x Conservative gain from Labour

Fauldhouse and the Briech Valley
2012: 2 x Labour, 1 x SNP
2017: 2 x Labour, 1 x SNP
2012-2017 Change: No Change

Whitburn and Blackburn
2012: 2 x Labour, 2 x SNP
2017: 2 x Labour, 1 x SNP, 1 x Conservative
2012-2017 Change: 1 x Conservative gain from SNP

Bathgate
2012: 2 x Labour, 2 x SNP
2017: 2xLabour; 1xSNP; 1xConservative
2012-2017 Change: Conservative gain one seat from SNP

Armadale and Blackridge
2012: 1 x Independent, 1 x Labour,  1 x SNP
2017: 1 x Independent, 1 x Labour,  1 x SNP
2012-2017 Change: No Change

Changes since 2017
† On 29 March 2020 Livingston South Councillor Peter Johnston resigned his seat due to illness. The By-Election was postponed due to the ongoing Coronavirus Pandemic. The By Election was held on Thursday 11 March 2021.
††On 11 May 2021 East Livingston and East Calder Labour Cllr Dave King died. A by-election was held on 5 August 2021 and was gained by the SNP's Thomas Ullathorne.
†††On 26 October 2021 Broxburn, Uphall and Winchburgh Labour Cllr Angela Doran-Timson left the Labour Party and joined the Conservatives.

By-elections since 2017

References 

2017
2017 Scottish local elections